Morpeth Dock Goods was a goods terminus in Birkenhead, England. The station was situated adjacent to Morpeth Dock, on the Birkenhead Dock Branch railway line. The station was opened in 1868–69, and closed in 1972.

References

Sources
 

Disused railway stations in the Metropolitan Borough of Wirral
Disused railway goods stations in Great Britain